Dani's Castle (also known as Rich, Jimmy & Kait's Castle during the third series) is a British children's comedy series broadcast on the CBBC Channel. Dani inherits a castle in Northern Ireland from her deceased aunt and gets more than she expected. She meets three residents, an unknown cousin, and two people who died 250 years ago. It is the spin-off series to Dani's House. Series 1 began airing on 17 January 2013 on the CBBC Channel, and 1 April 2013 on ABC3. Series 2 of Dani's Castle aired from 14 November 2013 to 3 January 2014. Series 3 aired from 7 July 2015 to 22 September 2015, and then returned for a finale Christmas episode on 15 December 2015. It was filmed in County Down in Northern Ireland. Currently, all 3 series are available to stream on BBC iPlayer.

Plot

Series 1

Following the events of Dani's House, Dani's Castle sees Dani re-evaluating her whole life after McHurtie's Hospital, a fictional medical drama/soap opera, is cancelled. But her fortunes soon change when her Great-Aunt Marjorie dies and leaves Dani with her very own castle. With dreams of becoming the lady of the manor, Dani arrives at her new home full of ideas and optimism. But she's soon brought up short when she reaches Bogmoor Castle to find it's been voted the "No.1 Worst Tourist Attraction" in the country for 10 years running, with crumbling towers, howling corridors, and an overgrown jungle for a garden, even a resident pair of young 250-year-old ghosts – Gabe and Esme. And Dani isn't the only heir; she soon encounters a troublesome cousin she didn't even know she had, who seems to break anything and everything. Worst of all: Great-Aunt Marjorie has left her a large stack of debts and unpaid bills.

Series 2

The new series picks up from series 1 and Dani has moved on. She's a Hollywood star now, but Bogmoor Castle is still her home and she cares about the people who live there. But since she can't be there in person, she can at least be a font of wisdom on the webcam. But Kait, Jimmy, Rich, Dylan, Esme, and Gabe still need her! Having left the castle in the hands of her cousins Rich and Jimmy, spectral ancestors Gabe and Esme, her best friend Kait, and Rich's little brother Dylan, there's still plenty for Dani to worry about. Also, there is a growing relationship between Kait and Rich. In this series, Rich is still coming up with money-making schemes for the castle – and sets up a brand new radio station, Bogmoor FM.

Series 3

The show was renewed for a new series and renamed Rich, Jimmy & Kait's Castle following Dani Harmer's exit. In the series Kait sets up her own business (Kait's bakes), while Rich and Jimmy work on adding a recording studio to Bogmoor FM, Gabe sets up a Ghostel, Leonie invites The Dead Headz to play on Bogmoor FM, and Dylan meets a ghost from the Titanic. Rich and Kait split up, a prank war breaks out, Gabe and Rich counsel a nervous ghost, Gabe and Leonie switch places with Rich and Kait, Gabe gets a visit from a Ghostel inspector, Kait wins best newcomer at the pet snack business of year award, and it's Dylan's birthday. Rich and Kait feel awkward when they are made to play two people in love when acting out Midsummer Night's Dream, Jimmy returns home from his Street Dance Academy tour, and Jimmy and Clare go on a picnic date. Jimmy and Clare get together and Rich and Kait get back together. Gabe wants to write a gossip novel. The series introduced two new characters, Clare (Jessica Forrest) and Leonie (Lucy Hutchinson). The series aired from 7 July 2015 to 15 December 2015. This was the final series.

Production
The show was filmed entirely on location at Killyleagh Castle in County Down, Northern Ireland. The first, second and third series were filmed in the summers of 2012, 2013 and 2014, respectively. It was produced by Raymond Lau with the lead writer being Paul Rose and the lead director being Dez McCarthy.

Cast

Series 1 Opening Titles Order: Dani Harmer, Kieran Alleyne, Niall Wright, Shannon Flynn, Lorenzo Rodriguez, Jordan Brown
Series 2 Opening Titles Order: Richard Wisker, Shannon Flynn, Niall Wright, Kieran Alleyne, Jordan Brown, Toby Murray, Dani Harmer
Series 3 Opening Titles Order: Richard Wisker, Shannon Flynn, Niall Wright, Kieran Alleyne, Toby Murray, Jessica Forrest, Lucy Hutchinson

Episodes

Broadcasting

Reception
Series 1 performed well, with most episodes in the CBBC Weekly Top 10. "Dani Harmer is one of the most exciting and successful young actresses on television and this new project will really showcase her unique comedy talents and her growth as a performer," says executive producer Elaine Sperber. "Dani has a huge following on CBBC and this new series will be a major treat for her existing and new fans". Harry Venning of The Stage disliked the laugh track, saying "Laughter tracks are an abomination. Dani’s Castle is genuinely funny and the producers should trust their young audience to find it so, unaided and alone."

CBBC Ratings

Series 1

Series 2

Series 3

Notes

Series 2 and onwards does not contain an audience laughing track in the background.

References

External links
CBBC Dani's Castle
ABC Dani's Castle
Dani's Castle BBC Media Centre

 
2010s British children's television series
2013 British television series debuts
2015 British television series endings
BBC children's television shows
BBC television sitcoms
British children's fantasy television series
British television spin-offs
Television series by Banijay
Television shows set in Northern Ireland
Works set in castles